Kolavai Lake is a lake adjoining the town of Chengalpattu in Tamil Nadu, India. During times of acute water shortage in summer, this lake serves as an additional source of water for the city of Chennai. The lake hosts migratory birds such as the whiskered tern, Indian spot-billed ducks, moorhens, coots, and small waders.

References

External links 
Governmentality: Panacea from Chaos, Why the Fisher Folk of Kolavai Lake Want the Government to Regulate Them

Lakes of Tamil Nadu
Kanchipuram district